HMS Largo Bay was a  anti-aircraft frigate of the British Royal Navy, named for Largo Bay in Fife.

The ship was originally ordered from William Pickersgill & Sons Ltd. of Southwick, Sunderland on 25 January 1943 as the  Loch Foin, and laid down on 8 February 1944. However the contract was then changed, and the ship was completed to a revised design as a Bay-class anti-aircraft frigate, launched on 3 October 1944, and commissioned on 26 January 1946.

Service history
After sea trials, Largo Bay sailed for the Mediterranean, joining the Escort Flotilla at Malta on 23 February 1946. She was first deployed in the eastern Mediterranean for the interception of merchant ships carrying illegal Jewish immigrants to Palestine. In March she returned to Malta for Flotilla duties. In August 1946 she returned to the UK to decommission and was placed into Plymouth Reserve Fleet.  In 1953 she took part in the Fleet Review to celebrate the Coronation of Queen Elizabeth II.

Largo Bay was placed on the Disposal List in 1958, and sold to the British Iron & Steel Corporation (BISCO) for demolition by Thos. W. Ward at Inverkeithing. She was towed to the breaker's yard, arriving on 11 July 1959.

References

Publications

 

1944 ships
Bay-class frigates